Second Show (theatrically as II nd Show, is a 2022 Indian-Sri Lankan bilingual horror thriller film directed by A.T. Gnanam in his directorial debut and co-produced by Mahadevan Ganesh and Saravanan for Siva Brothers with Kaushalya Wickramasinghe for Dark Room Creations. The film stars Ajmal Ameer, Pallavi Subhash and Hemal Ranasinghe in lead roles whereas Vidya Pradeep, Akshata Sonawane and Pooja Mondal made supportive roles.

The film is scheduled to release worldwide in June 2022 and the pre-release campaign began in May 2022. The film was released on 8 July 2022. The film's co-producer Kaushalya Wickramasinghe stated that the Tamil version of the film will be screened in 50 theaters across the island from 29 July 2022 and it will be shown as a distribution of the National Film Corporation.

Plot

Cast
 Ajmal Ameer		
 Pallavi Subhash
 Hemal Ranasinghe
 Vidya Pradeep
 Akshata Sonawane 
 Pooja Mondal
 Maira Singh
 Isha Chhabra
 Black Pondy
 Inba
 Sri Krish
 Suraj Nanda (Maurirtius)
 London Venkat
 Gifty (London)
 Robert (London)
 Mukkur N. Ramajayam

Production
This is the debut film direction by A.T. Gnanm. It was filmed in 2019 in London and Birmingham, England. Filmed in both Tamil and Sinhala on the same stage, the Sinhala dialogues are by film director Thisara Imbulana. The colorist and digital color correction of the film is Karthik Chandrasekar. The film stars Sri Lankan actor Hemal Ranasinghe, popular Marathi actress Pallavi Subhash and Kollywood Filmfare Award-winning actor Ajmal Ameer. The other characters are played by Kollywood actress Vidya Pradeep, Telugu actress Akshatha Sonawane and Gujarati model Pooja Mondal.

Song music done by Ambi Subramaniam, Praneev Verl, Dialogues by S. Mohan, lyricists are Pa. Vijay, A.T.Gnanam, and Ambi Prabass. Diwakar, Sathya Prakash, Deepak, Shrikanth, Saranya Gopinath, Bindu Subramaniam and Chinamyi are the background singers. Meanwhile, Bhargavi Kalidas is the co-director, Thangaraj, S. Sathyamoorthi are assistant directors, Vinaya Devv is the costume designer, Sri Krish, Suraj Nanda (Mauritius) are choreographers as well as Kall Premkumar is the art director. The film features songs in Sinhala is sung by Kasun Kalhara, Uresha Ravihari, Kushani Sandareka, Kavindi Gunasekara and Dinendra Bandara.

References

External links
 
 Official trailer

2022 films
2022 multilingual films
2020s Tamil-language films
2020s Sinhala-language films
2022 horror films
Indian horror films
Indian multilingual films
Sri Lankan horror films